Antennellopsis is a monotypic genus of hydrozoans belonging to the family Halopterididae. The only species is Antennellopsis integerrima.

The species is found in Japan, New Zealand.

References

Halopterididae
Hydrozoan genera
Monotypic cnidarian genera